Tina is an unincorporated community in Knott County, Kentucky.

References

Unincorporated communities in Knott County, Kentucky
Unincorporated communities in Kentucky